Volvo Open Cup is a figure skating competition held in Riga, Latvia. It was part of the ISU Challenger Series in the 2014–15 season. The competition may include men's singles, ladies' singles, pair skating, and ice dancing at various levels. 

The event is sometimes held three times in a year, usually January, May, and November. Some editions attract higher-profile competitors than others.

Senior medalists
CS: ISU Challenger Series

Men

Women

Pairs

Ice dance

Junior medalists

Men

Women

Pairs

Ice dancing

Advanced novice medalists

Boys

Girls

Pairs

Ice dancing

References

External links
 Kristal Ice Skating Club competitions

 
ISU Challenger Series
International figure skating competitions hosted by Latvia
Sports competitions in Riga